Kioloa is a small hamlet located on the South Coast of New South Wales, Australia and is within the City of Shoalhaven local government area. It is pronounced by locals as 'Ky-ola'.

The Australian National University's Kioloa Coastal Campus is north of the town.

Its neighbour is Bawley Point, which is accessed via Murramarang Road, the only sealed access road in and out of Kioloa. Both of these villages rely mainly upon tourism as a source of income.  Kioloa has three large caravan parks offering a range of accommodation options to suit all budgets and one general store. The area is well known throughout the region for its pristine beaches and peak surfing conditions. As an isolated coastal retreat, Kioloa is infamous among holiday-goers for its lack of mobile phone reception and its large peaceful rays. 

Kioloa is the southern terminus of local bus services provided on weekdays by Ulladulla Bus Lines. Route 741 runs twice daily from Kioloa to Ulladulla via Bawley Point, Termeil, Tabourie and Burrill Lake. An additional afternoon service runs on school days.

Kioloa had a public school from 1879 to 1893 and 1912 to 1922, classified variously as a "public", "half-time" or  "provisional" school.

References

City of Shoalhaven
Towns in the South Coast (New South Wales)
Coastal towns in New South Wales